Paul Rejer (born 16 May 1954) is an English former football referee.

Career

He began refereeing in 1978 in leagues local to his home, becoming an assistant referee in the Football League in 1986. In 1992, he progressed to the Premier League list of assistants, the first season of the league. Also the FIFA Linesmen’s List, the very first year of FIFA Linesman.  He was elevated to the Referees List in the Football League in 1994. He was fortunate to have officiated as a Referee or Assistant Referee at all 92 professional clubs in England.

His first match in charge after his promotion in 1994 was the Football League Third Division (now League Two) encounter between Barnet and Scunthorpe United at Underhill Stadium on 13 August 1994, which finished 2-1 to the away side.

He was Linesman in the FA Challenge Cup at Wembley Stadium in 1994 between Manchester United and Chelsea (4-0). His other appearance at Wembley was in the FA Charity Shield in 1991 between Arsenal and Tottenham Hotspur F.C. He was Linesman in the UEFA Cup Final in 1992 between Torino and Ajax (2-2). He also officiated in three World Cup qualifying games and three UEFA Champions League games. He officiated in two FA Cup Semi Finals 1991, Nottingham Forest v West Ham United, 1993 Arsenal v Tottenham Hotspur F.C. and two League Cup Semi Finals. In 1997, he refereed an FA Trophy semi-final and two FA Vase Semi Finals, in 1996, Mangotsfield United v Clitheroe and Tiverton Town and Taunton Town in 1999  Other significant games he has been involved in during his career: 2 League Cup Semi Finals – 4th Official, 1996 League One Play Off Semi Final – 4th Official, 1998 League One Play Off Semi Final – 4th Official. 1994 Staffordshire County FA Senior Cup Final - Referee LDV Vans Final, 2003– 4th Official.

In August 2003 he retired from active refereeing and became an assessor on the football league. Then in 2004 he was appointed Select Group Assistant Referee Coach, coaching the Assistant Referee’s who operate on the Premier League. At the same time he became an assessor on the Premier League. In 2007, he was promoted to Select Group Assistant referee Manager. The Assistant Referee’s Darren Cann and Mike Mullarkey, who were the World Cup Assistant Referee’s in South Africa and the European Champions League final, both in 2010, gave him ‘significant’ credit for their development. Howard Webb also made reference to the help Paul had been to him personally.

In November 2012 he was appointed Training and Development Manager for the Professional Referees Organization (PRO), responsible for all the match officials that operate in Major League Soccer (MLS), in the USA based in New York City.

He is an expert in the Laws of the Game, particularly Law 11 (Offside), and is consulted whenever there are law changes to deliver interpretations.

Rejer is world-renowned as a Referee coach; he is in great demand in World Soccer. He has delivered “Premier Skills” courses with Keith Hackett on behalf of the English Premier League and the British Council, in Yaounde, Cameroon, February 2011, Addis Ababa, Ethiopia, March 2011, Kuala Lumpur, Malaysia, July 2011, Nairobi, Kenya, November, 2011, Logos, Nigeria, March 2012. He has also appeared at referees conferences as a principal speaker at Dublin, Republic Of Ireland Referees Annual Conference, February 2010, St. Andrews, Scotland, Scottish FA referees annual conference, May, 2009. FA of Wales annual conference at Newtown, Wales, January 2009 and 2010. Soccer Nation Referees Conference and exhibition, Los Angeles, February 2013 and 2014.

References

1954 births
English football referees
Living people